Final Battle (2019) was a two-night professional wrestling event produced by American promotion Ring of Honor (ROH). It took place on Friday, December 13 and Sunday, December 15, 2019, at the UMBC Event Center in Baltimore, Maryland and the 2300 Arena in Philadelphia, Pennsylvania, respectively. Friday's show was a pay-per-view broadcast, while Sunday's was a set of tapings for ROH's flagship program Ring of Honor Wrestling. It was the 18th event under the Final Battle chronology.

Storylines
The event featured professional wrestling matches, which involve different wrestlers from pre-existing scripted feuds, plots, and storylines that play out on ROH's television programs. Wrestlers portray villains or heroes as they follow a series of events that build tension and culminate in a wrestling match or series of matches.

PCO challenged Rush for the ROH World Championship by virtue of winning an eight-man single elimination tournament to determine the #1 contender for the title at this event. PCO defeated Kenny King in the first round, Dalton Castle in the semifinals and then his Villain Enterprises stablemate Marty Scurll in the final.

Results

Night 1 Final Battle (PPV)

Night 2: Final Battle Fallout (TV tapings)

Reception 
When the main event was announced, PCO's election as Rush's rival for the World Championship was questioned, due to his age (51 years old). Also, PCO's title win was criticized. On the December 23, Wrestling Observer Newsletter published a poll where the PCO vs Rush was voted as the worst match of the event. Dave Meltzer gave the match a one star, saying "There were style issues between the two and the craziness just didn’t work in a world title situation".

References

2019 in professional wrestling
2019 in Maryland
2019 in Pennsylvania
Events in Baltimore
Events in Philadelphia
2019
Professional wrestling in Baltimore
Professional wrestling in Philadelphia
December 2019 events in the United States